Le Silence de la mer (literal English translation: The Silence of the Sea) is a 1949 film by Jean-Pierre Melville. It was his first feature film and was based on the 1942 book of the same name written by "Vercors" (the pen name of Jean Bruller). Set during WWII in occupied France, the story concerns the relationship of a Frenchman (Jean-Marie Robain) and his niece (Nicole Stéphane) with a German lieutenant, Werner von Ebrennac (Howard Vernon), who is billetted in their house. Most of the film was actually shot inside Bruller's own home outside of Paris.

Plot
In occupied France early in 1941, when Werner von Ebrennac, a German lieutenant with a limp, is billetted in a house in a small village that a retired man shares with his adult niece, the pair, without having to discuss it, agree never to speak to or acknowledge the unwanted intruder. Most nights as the uncle smokes his pipe and the niece does some sewing by the fire, the officer, at first dressed in his uniform and later in civilian clothes, comes to warm himself and politely engages them in a brief one-sided conversation. Speaking good French, he reveals that he is an unmarried composer and this is the first time he has been to France, though he has long studied and admired French literature and culture, which he seems to prefer to his own (except regarding music). Loyal to Hitler, he hopes the Nazi invasion will bring about a lasting "marriage" between France and Germany that will benefit everyone, a point he comes back to day after day and illustrates by referencing Beauty and the Beast (Germany being the beast, who only needs France accept it to turn into a prince). Werner often looks warmly at the niece as he extols the virtues of France; she remains obdurately silent, but occasionally betrays her growing feelings by a faint quiver of her fingers.

Werner gets some leave in the spring and spends two weeks in Paris. When he returns to the village, the uncle and niece do not see him for over a week. Finally, one night he knocks at the door and does not enter until the uncle, breaking his silence, invites the man in. Once more wearing his uniform, Werner tells his hosts about how his excitement to see Paris was undercut by the presence of the occupying forces and finally turned to disillusionment and despair once he learned about the Holocaust and was told by a group of fanatic German officers, including an old friend, that the Nazi plan is to destroy the French spirit and culture and subjugate France to Germany forever. Stopping short of urging the uncle and niece to rebel, Werner announces that he requested a transfer to the front, and he is leaving in the morning. When he says "adieu", the niece breaks her silence to whisper "adieu" in return.

The next day, the uncle sets out a quotation from Anatole France for Werner: "Il est beau qu'un soldat désobéisse à des ordres criminels." ("It is a fine thing when a soldier disobeys a criminal order.") Werner reads it, exchanges glances with the uncle, and leaves. The niece and her uncle eat lunch in silence.

Cast
 Howard Vernon as Werner von Ebrennac
 Nicole Stéphane as The Niece
 Jean-Marie Robain as The Uncle

Production
The film, which was made shortly after Jean-Pierre Melville was demobilized from the French Resistance, is colored by Melville's own experience of the sacrifices and painful moral intransigence that resistance demands. It is one of several films he made about the Resistance, along with Léon Morin, Priest (1961) and Army of Shadows (1969). An unnamed Frenchman and his niece are obliged to provide lodgings for a German officer and register their resistance by refusing to speak to him. Maintaining their silence becomes harder as the officer, von Ebrennac, talks to them, and reveals a decency and his own doubts about the war.  "He's clearly related to von Stroheim's sympathetic commandant in Renoir's La Grande Illusion, a figure whose loyalty is to something greater than nationalism.  His unwilling hosts [and] the echo chamber [of] their mute opposition makes him question both himself and his mission."

Von Ebrennac's monologues and the extensive voice-over narration by the uncle mean that, the title notwithstanding, there is a significant amount of talk in the film.

Release
Le Silence de la Mer was released in Paris on 22 April 1949. It took in 464,032 admissions in Paris and 1,371,687 admissions in France as a whole.

Reception
"Melville made the film on a very small budget. It's a remarkably assured apprentice work. Melville and his cameraman Henri Decaë show considerable cinematic technique: despite much of the film taking place in a single room, they avoid any sort of claustrophobia." The film has been described as "anti-cinematographic" due to the unique method of narration used to give voice to the (mostly) silent Frenchman and his niece.

References

Sources

External links
 
 
 
Le silence de la mer: Stranger in the House an essay by Geoffrey O'Brien at the Criterion Collection

1949 films
1940s war drama films
French war drama films
Films based on French novels
Films directed by Jean-Pierre Melville
French black-and-white films
1949 drama films
1940s French-language films
1940s German-language films
French World War II films
1940s French films